Cyperus miliifolius is a species of sedge that is native to southern parts of Central America and northern parts of South America.

See also 
 List of Cyperus species

References 

miliifolius
Plants described in 1837
Flora of Costa Rica
Flora of Bolivia
Flora of Colombia
Flora of Brazil
Flora of Ecuador
Flora of Guyana
Flora of Panama
Flora of Peru
Flora of Venezuela
Taxa named by Carl Sigismund Kunth
Taxa named by Eduard Friedrich Poeppig